Phaya Thai is a district in central Bangkok, Thailand. From the north clockwise, its neighbouring districts are: Bang Sue, Chatuchak, Din Daeng, Ratchathewi, and Dusit. Despite sharing a name, due to boundary changes, Phaya Thai Road and Phaya Thai BTS Station are in the adjoining Ratchathewi District.

History
Phaya Thai district was set up in 1966 by taking areas that were part of Dusit and Bang Kapi Districts. It was named after Phaya Thai palace, which was built in 1909 at King Rama V's behest. Since then, many changes to the district have been made. In 1973, the Huai Khwang district was separated from Phaya Thai. Later in 1978, as an effort to balance the population among districts, the boundaries between Phaya Thai, Huai Khwang, and Bang Kapi Districts were modified. A new Ratchathewi district was created by carving off the southern part of Phaya Thai in 1989. In 1993, some eastern parts were moved out of the district to the newly-formed Din Daeng, leaving Phaya Thai with only one remaining sub-district, Sam Sen Nai.

Due to the split off of Ratchathewi, Phaya Thai Road is no longer in Phaya Thai District. It runs through Ratchathewi and Pathum Wan. Similarly, Phaya Thai BTS Station is in Ratchathewi, on Phaya Thai Road.

During the reign of King Rama VI, Phaya Thai was an area filled with military cantonments. "Sanam Pao" is another familiar name of the area, owing the original name of Phaholyothin Road, the main thoroughfare through the area.

Administration
The district is divided into two sub-districts (khwaeng).

Places 

Phaya Thai is home to many government offices, such as the Government Savings Bank, the Ministry of Finance, and the Ministry of Natural Resources and Environment. A large portion of the district on its east side is occupied by the Royal Thai Army, including the Army Stadium, and the military-owned television Channel 5. Wat Phai Tan (วัดไผ่ตัน) is the only Buddhist temple in the district.

The population is more concentrated in the area called Saphan Khwai (สะพานควาย) with many shops, apartments, and a BigC shopping center.

The Thai Philatelic Museum was renovated and moved to a building behind the Samsen Nai post office at Saphan Khwai in December 2004. Among the exhibits are awards Thai philatelists received from various international competitions together with photocopies of the winning entries, posters depicting rare Thai stamps, and winning postage stamp designs.

Transportation
There are three BTS skytrain stations in Phaya Thai: Sanam Pao, Ari, and Saphan Khwai. The Bangkok MRT station Bang Sue is in the northwest corner of the district.

Phaya Thai is also served by the Sam Sen railway station of the State Railway of Thailand (SRT), which every train (except the Eastern Line) must pass here before reaching (or departing) from Hua Lamphong railway station. The rail tracks also serve as the dividing line between Phaya Thai's Phaya Thai Sub-district and Dusit's Thanon Nakhon Chai Si Sub-district.

People
Former Thai Prime Minister Thaksin Shinawatra (2001–2006) was a police officer who began his career at Phaya Thai Police Station. Shinawatra and his political party, Thai Rak Thai were ousted in a coup in September 2006.

Notes

References

External links
 BMA website
 Phaya Thai district office (Thai only)

 
Districts of Bangkok